Fredrick Wain (1887 – 1962) was an English footballer who played for Stoke.

Career
Wain was born in Stoke-upon-Trent and played for a number of amateur team before joining Stoke in 1908. He played twice for Stoke in the 1908–09 season before returning to amateur football with Stone Town, Hanley Swifts and Hanley Town. It is believed that Wain played for Hanley well into his 50s.

Career statistics

References

English footballers
Stoke City F.C. players
1887 births
1962 deaths
Association football goalkeepers